The Oblongs may refer to:

The Television series, The Oblongs
The artist, Angus Oblong
the Oblongs… is the theme song for Teenagers & Adults from the TV series the Oblongs... sung by They Might Be Giants.